Edward Garland may refer to:

 Ed Garland (1895–1980), New Orleans jazz string bass player
 Edward Garland (cricketer) (1826–1882), English cricketer
 Edward Joseph Garland (1887–1974), Canadian farmer, diplomat and federal politician

See also
Donald Edward Garland (1918–1940), Irish recipient of the Victoria Cross